The Watson–Schwartz test is a screening test for diagnosing intermittent porphyria, although it might also become positive in porphyria cutanea tarda (a skin form of porphyria). In this method, porphobilinogen is detected by a color reaction with Ehrlich reagent and confirming that the color is not removed by chloroform.

References 

Porphyrias
Medical tests